Kung Te-cheng (23 February 1920 – 28 October 2008) was a 77th generation descendant of Confucius in the main line of descent. He was the final person to be appointed Duke Yansheng and the first Sacrificial Official to Confucius. He helped formulate and was in charge of officiating the modern Confucius ceremony held annually in the Republic of China (Taiwan). In addition to Ceremonial Official, he held numerous posts in the Republic of China government, including member of the National Assembly from 1946 to 1991, President of the Examination Yuan from 1984 to 1993, and senior advisor to the President of the Republic of China from 1948 to 2000. He held professorships at National Taiwan University, Fu Jen Catholic University, and Soochow University.

Birth and early life

Kung was born in his family estate in Qufu, Shandong. He was the third child and only son of Kong Lingyi (孔令貽), Duke Yansheng, by his second concubine, Wang Baocui (王寶翠). His father's name contained the character 令 Ling because it was the generation name for 76th generation descendants of Confucius. On 6 June 1920, shortly after his birth, he was appointed Duke Yansheng by President Xu Shichang in accordance with an imperial tradition dating back to 1055 of bestowing the title on the eldest male in each generation of the main line of descent. His father, Kong Lingyi (1872 – 8 November 1919), had died before Kung Te-cheng's birth. Kung Te-cheng became the last person to be granted the centuries-old dukedom when the title was abolished by the Nationalist Government in 1935 and replaced with that of Ceremonial Official to Confucius (大成至聖先師奉祀官, literally "Ceremonial Officer of the Great Accomplished and Most Sacred Teacher").

At the age of 6, in Shandong he met University of Pennsylvania dean Emory Johnson, who invited him to attend the university.

Political career
The Japanese offered him the position of puppet Emperor of China in 1937, but Kung declined the offer.

In January 1938, Kung fled the Japanese invasion of Shandong to Hankou. The Japanese blew up his Sacred Mount Taishan residence. Premier H. H. Kung, also a descendant of Confucius, greeted Duke Kung Te-cheng as he arrived. TIME magazine addressed him by the title "Duke Kung", and referred to his residence as the "ducal seat".

In response to talk of Japanese offers to make him "ruler of China", Kung said: "I have never even been approached by the Japanese! I consider myself at the orders of the Chinese Government. I am a patriot, ready to take up arms and fight the Japanese as soon as I reach the age of military service—that is 18 years... my wife is expecting a child."

He was a member of the National Assembly of the Republic of China from 1946 to 1991 and helped draft the 1947 Constitution of the Republic of China. From July 1956 to April 1964 he was Director of National Palace Museum in Taipei. Kung served as President of the Examination Yuan from 1984 to 1993. He was a senior adviser to the President of the Republic of China from 1948 to 2000.

Family
Kung's name included 德 Dé, the generation name for 77th generation descendants of Confucius. Kung's father, Kong Lingyi (孔令貽) (Qufu, 1872 - Beijing 8 November 1919), inherited the Dukedom Yansheng in 1876, upon the death of his father, the 30th Duke Yansheng.  Kong founded a county school in Qufu and was also president of the Four Clans Teachers' College (founded in conjunction with the descendants of Yan Hui, Mencius, and Zeng Zi).  In 1889, he was appointed to the Guozijian.  Following the Xinhai Revolution, Kong was given a government post in the new government but declined the position.  Kong was a supporter of Yuan Shikai and was given a First Grade Medal and Sash of Auspicious Glory and the rank of Prince of the First Rank by Yuan in 1915.

Kong Lingyi had a total of two wives and two concubines.  His first wife, Lady Sun (孫氏), was the daughter of Sun Yuwen (孫毓汶) (1833 - 1899), an Imperial Envoy, and she was one year older than Kong. Lady Sun's grandfather, Sun Ruizhen (孫瑞珍) (1783–1858), was a scholar and official during the Guangxu Emperor's reign.  Kong and Lady Sun married in 1888, but she died of illness without issue in 1899, aged 28. Kong's first concubine, Lady Feng, similarly did not have any children, and she died in 1928. Kong's second wife, Tao Wenpu, (陶文譜, known as Lady Tao [陶氏]), was the youngest daughter of Tao Shiyun (陶式鋆), Magistrate of Daming Prefecture, and Kong married her in 1905; compared with Lady Sun, though Tao family was rich at the time, it wasn't as prominent as Sun family. She bore Kong one son who died at the age of three years.  Lady Tao was described as a petty, jealous woman who mistreated Kung Te-cheng's mother, Kong Lingyi's second concubine Wang Baocui (王寶翠) (1894 - Qufu, 11 March 1920), the daughter of a peasant from Zunhua County, Hebei.

On 4 October 1919, Kong Lingyi went to Beijing after receiving news of his father-in-law, Tao Shiyun's, death.  Soon afterwards, Kong was afflicted with a subcutaneous ulcer on his back.  He died on 8 November 1919 at the Mansion of the Duke of Yansheng (衍聖公府) in Beijing.

At the time of his father's death, Kung Te-cheng's mother, Wang Baocui, was five months pregnant, and on 23 February 1920, she gave birth to Kung.  Seventeen days later, on 11 March 1920, Wang died.

Kung had two older sisters, both borne by his mother Wang Baocui. The elder, Kong Deqi (孔德齊, 1913-1939), married the youngest son of Feng Shu (馮恕), a Beijing calligrapher and founder of Beijing Electric Lamp Company, in 1931, but died as a young woman. The younger, Kong Demao (孔德懋) (1917-2021), married Ke Changfen (柯昌汾), third and youngest son of Qing dynasty historian Ke Shaomin (柯劭忞) and Wu Zhifang, daughter of Qing dynasty prose writer Wu Rulun, in 1935. Ke Shaomin's sworn brother was President Xu Shichang. Kong Demao had one daughter (Ke Lan), one son (Ke Jian), and one grandson (the son of Ke Lan), Liu Yong. She lived in mainland China and had written a book about her experiences growing up at the family estate in Qufu.

Kung married Sun Qifang (孫琪方), a great-granddaughter of Qing dynasty scholar-official Sun Jianai, who was the first president of Peking University, on 16 December 1936. Sun was born in Shouxian, Anhui, and his family's business combine (one of the first in modern China) includes the Fou Foong Flour Company, the largest flour mill in Asia. They had four children, two sons and two daughters:
 Lucy Wei-O Kung (孔維鄂, b. 10 January 1938), elder daughter of Kung Te-cheng, married to Major Lester Mykel Conger  (包雅志) in 1960, and they had one child, George Sean Conger (包尚恩); she lives in the United States.
Kong Wei-yi (孔維益, 7 November 1939 - 25 February 1989), elder son of Kung Te-cheng; married Yu Yuejie (于曰潔) on 17 January 1971 and had one son, the 79th lineal descendant Kung Tsui-chang (b. 1975), and one daughter, Kung Tsui-mei (孔垂梅, b. 1971)
Kong Weilai (孔維崍, b. 1941), second daughter of Kung Te-cheng; married in 1973 to Lee Sha (李莎) and have a son and a daughter
Kong Weining (孔維寧, 1947 - 10 June 2010), second son of Kung Te-cheng; married Wu Ya (吳涯) on 7 December 1974 and had two daughters, Kong Chuijiu (孔垂玖) and Kong Chuiyong (孔垂永)

His children all have 維 Wei in their name since it is a generation name, signifying that they are 78th generation descendants of Confucius.

Death
On 20 October 2008, Kung was sent to Tzu Chi hospital in Sindian City. He acquired pneumonia and sepsis when he arrived at the emergency department. Kung died 8 days later, on 28 October 2008 at 10:50 am, of heart and respiratory failure. The ROC Ministry of the Interior appointed his grandson Kung Tsui-chang to succeed him as Sacrificial Official to Confucius.

Ancestry

References

External links
Taiwan Confucian Temple ceremony
Taipei Confucian Temple local website
 List of direct descendants of Confucius
 Website of the Kong/K'ung family (mainly in Chinese)
Obituary in Wall Street Journal Nov. 1, 2008

1920 births
2008 deaths
Academic staff of Fu Jen Catholic University
Senior Advisors to President Chen Shui-bian
Taiwanese educators
Deaths from multiple organ failure
People from Qufu
Taiwanese Presidents of the Examination Yuan
Republic of China politicians from Shandong
Chinese Confucianists
Descendants of Confucius
Politicians from Jining
Taiwanese people from Shandong
Chinese Civil War refugees
Senior Advisors to President Chiang Kai-shek
Senior Advisors to President Chiang Ching-kuo
Senior Advisors to President Lee Teng-hui
Academic staff of the National Taiwan University
Academic staff of Soochow University (Taiwan)